The Landeskirchenamt München (i.e. Church Office) is the administrative headquarters of the Evangelical Lutheran Church in Bavaria. The building is located in the Maxvorstadt, Munich, Bavaria, Germany.

Maxvorstadt
Christianity in Munich
Buildings and structures in Munich
Munich Landeskirchenamt
Buildings and structures completed in 1928